Johann Sebastian Bass (also known by the abbreviation JSB) is an Austrian electropop music group formed in 2011. In 2015, they competed in Wer singt für Österreich?, the Austrian national competition to select an entrant for the Eurovision Song Contest 2015, for which Austria was the host nation. The group advanced to the final, where they placed fifth of six contestants with their song Absolutio.

History and style 
Formed in 2011, the band consists of three members performing under the pseudonyms "Martinus Bass" (vocals), "Domenicus Bass" (synthesizer and electronic harpsichord), and "Davidus Bass" (percussion and samples). They released their first EP, Cantata per una macchina, Opus 1, in 2012, followed by Voodoo in 2014. The same year, they released their first full-length album, Sugar Suite, on Vienna Wildstyle Recordings.

The band are distinctive for performing in rococo-style clothing of powdered wigs, makeup, and brocade waistcoats.

Discography

Albums 
 2014: Sugar Suite

EPs 
 2012: Cantata per una macchina, Opus 1
 2014: Voodoo

Singles 
 2012: Computer Lovin’
 2014: Voodoo
 2014: Bass
 2014: Heart of Stone
 2015: Absolutio
 2015: Monsters

References

External links 
 Official site
 

Electropop groups